The 1978–79 Rotary Watches National Basketball League season was the seventh season of the National Basketball League.

The league was sponsored by Rotary Watches and the number of teams participating increased to eleven.

Doncaster completed the league and National Cup double, but Crystal Palace won the newly introduced Playoffs.

Team changes
Leicester switched back to Loughborough and Bedford dropped out of the league. Bracknell and Sunderland joined; the latter playing at the Crowtree Leisure Centre in the centre of Sunderland.

National League

First Division

deducted two points *

Second Division

Rotary Watches playoffs

Semi-finals

Third Place

Final

Butlins National Cup Final

References

See also
Basketball in England
British Basketball League
English Basketball League
List of English National Basketball League seasons

National Basketball League (England) seasons
 
British